Dallah may refer to:

 Dallah (Mali), a town in Mali
 Dallah (coffee pot), a traditional pot with a long spout, used to make Arabic coffee